Jesús Enrique Jackson Ramírez (24 December 1945 – 1 December 2021) was a Mexican politician affiliated with the Institutional Revolutionary Party (PRI). He was a member of the Chamber of Deputies from the first electoral region to the LXIII Legislature of the Mexican Congress.

Life
Jackson was born in Los Mochis, Sinaloa. He studied for, but never received, a bachelor's degree in Public Administration from the National Autonomous University of Mexico (UNAM) and started a career in the federal bureaucracy and the PRI. He joined the party in 1970 and began his civil service career in the 1970s in agencies such as IDECO (1973–74) and the Secretariat of Labor (1977–83). Between 1983 and 1985, he was the director general of Liconsa, then a chapter of the Compañía Nacional de Subsistencias Populares (CONASUPO), which produced and distributed milk for social welfare programs.

From mid-1980s to the mid-1990s, before the introduction of direct elections of local officials in Mexico City, Jackson was appointed chief administrator (delegado) of Mexico City's Cuauhtémoc borough (1985–1988), took charge of the Federal District's security office (1988) and headed the public transportation authority (1989–1990). In 1998, he became the Federal District's secretary of government.

Additionally, Jackson had a lengthy career in the PRI; he bounced around between many different positions, including director of the party's Institute for Political, Economic and Social Studies (1981), president of the PRI in the Federal District (1990–92), and president of Fundación Colosio, A.C. (1995).

He died on 1 December 2021, at the age of 75.

Legislative career
Jackson was elected to the Chamber of Deputies for the first time in 1997, for the LVII Legislature. He was the president of the first Political Coordination Board and sat on commissions dealing with the Federal District, Government, Constitutional Points, and National Defense, as well as an investigative commission that looked into the operations of CONASUPO.

Three years later, Jackson headed to the Senate for the LVIII and LIX Legislatures, where he presided over the Board of Directors and the Political Coordination Board, making him one of the highest-ranking PRI members in the Senate.

During the first months of 2005, he participated in the PRI presidential primaries.

After 15 years, the PRI returned Jackson to San Lázaro as a proportional representation deputy from the first electoral region, representing his home state of Sinaloa, to the Chamber of Deputies to the LXIII Legislature. He sat on three commissions: Bicameral for National Security, National Defense, and Navy, and was the PRI's vice coordinator in the Chamber of Deputies. Additionally, he was designated as a representative from the Chamber of Deputies to the Constituent Assembly of Mexico City, which will convene from September 2016 to January 2017. His selection came after the naming of another PRI proportional representation deputy, Carmen Salinas, prompted significant backlash.

References

See also
2006 Mexican general election

1945 births
2021 deaths
Members of the Chamber of Deputies (Mexico)
Members of the Senate of the Republic (Mexico)
Presidents of the Senate of the Republic (Mexico)
Institutional Revolutionary Party politicians
National Autonomous University of Mexico alumni
People from Los Mochis
Politicians from Sinaloa
Mexican people of American descent
Mexican people of English descent
21st-century Mexican politicians
Members of the Constituent Assembly of Mexico City
20th-century Mexican politicians